Drew Pavlou (born 4 June 1999) is an Australian political activist best known for his criticism of the Chinese government and Chinese Communist Party. Pavlou is also known for organising protests on-campus in support of the 2019–20 Hong Kong protests.

In May 2020, he was suspended for two years from the University of Queensland, which alleged 11 instances of misconduct. 
The action drew national attention in Australia, including from former Prime Minister Kevin Rudd. An appeal of his case by the UQ Senate Disciplinary Appeals Committee upheld two of the initial charges and reduced his suspension to one semester. Pavlou returned to UQ in early 2021.

In December 2021, Pavlou launched the Drew Pavlou Democratic Alliance federal political party. He ran for the Australian Senate in the 2022 Australian federal election, alongside five other candidates, but was unsuccessful. 

In July 2022, Pavlou was arrested in London for an alleged bomb threat against the Chinese Embassy; an allegation he denied. Pavlou has alleged that the bomb threat was part of a campaign to have him falsely charged and arrested. No charges were issued; Pavlou alleged the Metropolitan Police denied him consular services.

Early life and education

Pavlou's family, who are Greek Cypriots from the Larnaca District of Cyprus, migrated to Australia in the 1960s to open a number of hospitality and retail shops on the Gold Coast in Queensland. He was born on 4 June 1999, something that he has linked to the end of the 1989 Tiananmen Square protests. At two years old, Pavlou's family moved to Brisbane, where he would then go on to complete high school at Villanova College. He was then admitted to the University of Queensland where he was studying for a Bachelor of Arts majoring in Philosophy before his suspension. His grandmother's brother was a fighter with Greek nationalist guerrilla organisation EOKA, and was killed during the Cyprus Emergency.

Activism and controversies

2019 Hong Kong protests in UQ 
In July 2019, during the 2019–2020 Hong Kong protests, Pavlou organised a protest at the University of Queensland in support of the Hong Kong democracy movement. He has alleged that he was assaulted twice during clashes with counter-protestors who were supporting the Chinese Government. The counter-protesters were in the hundreds and had shouted pro-Beijing slogans and played China's national anthem over loudspeakers. Covering the incident, the LA Times wrote: "Things quickly turned violent. A man in the crowd rushed at Pavlou, snatching his megaphone. A second man shoved him. In the ensuing scuffles, one student from Hong Kong was tackled and grabbed by the throat; another had her shirt ripped open." Brisbane-based Chinese Consular-General and adjunct professor at UQ, Xu Jie, responded to the protests by condoning counter-protestors for "self-motivated patriotic behaviour" and condemning the protest as "anti-China separatist activities". Pavlou responded by alleging Xu Jie was inciting violence and issuing a death threat, a claim which was rejected by the Chinese embassy in Canberra. The Magistrates Court rejected the application for a case before it was heard at trial, citing international diplomatic immunity laws.

Suspension from the University of Queensland 

Throughout April and May 2020, Pavlou was summoned to the University of Queensland disciplinary board after a 186-page report suggested he violated university student discipline policies 11 times, and was suspended for 2 years. Former Australian Prime Minister Kevin Rudd criticised Chancellor Peter Varghese's handling of the suspension, claiming the university was overly conciliatory to Beijing.

Allegations by the university included bullying, discrimination, and harassment of students and staff, both online and on-campus. ABC News has reported that complaints raised to the board include Pavlou improperly claiming to make statements on behalf of the university and a Facebook post of Pavlou posing in front of the UQ Confucius Institute in a biohazard suit during the COVID-19 pandemic.

Pavlou admitted to directing profanity at students on Facebook and another university forum after UQ claimed complaints were raised by a number of students. On 5 May, Pavlou walked out of a disciplinary board hearing, labelling the hearing as a "Stalinist show trial". Pavlou's legal team claimed that they were denied access to confidential university documents that may demonstrate UQ collusion with the Chinese government. A spokesperson for the university stated that the matter did not concern political freedom of speech but misbehaviour, that university policy is developed independently of politics, and that the university was unable to comment directly on the matters of the hearing.

On 29 May, the board handed down its decision to suspend Pavlou for two years, the remainder of Pavlou's tenure as UQ senator. UQ Chancellor Peter Varghese expressed concern on the UQ News website about "the findings and the severity of the penalty", convening an out-of-session meeting of the UQ Senate to discuss the matter.

On 2 June, Pavlou sought a review from the UQ Senate Disciplinary Appeals Committee (SDAC), the appellate body for disciplinary matters formed from the UQ Senate, and student and staff representatives. On 13 July, SDAC issued its findings, concluding that two counts of serious misconduct were justified, however dismissing other charges. As a result, SDAC reduced the suspension from two years to one semester (roughly six months). In a statement released by the Committee and Chancellor Varghese, they explained that "neither of the findings of serious misconduct concerned Mr Pavlou's personal or political views about China or Hong Kong", and that Pavlou is now ineligible to return as a UQ senator, under the University of Queensland Act.

In September 2020, the Queensland Crime and Corruption Commission declined a request by Pavlou to investigate Chancellor Peter Varghese and former Vice-Chancellor Peter Høj, citing "insufficient evidence to suggest anyone who was subject of the complaint had engaged in corrupt conduct". The university responded in a press statement that it was pleased by the findings, and that it had been advised by the commission that no action will be taken.

Pavlou returned to university in early 2021.

Court case against the University of Queensland 

On 11 June 2020, Pavlou launched a case against the University of Queensland, Chancellor Varghese, and former Vice-Chancellor Høj, seeking damages of 3.5 million for an alleged breach of contract and defamation. The case was lodged with the Supreme Court of Queensland. In a response to an ABC News inquiry, a UQ spokesperson said, "when we receive a formal notice of claim we will consider it and respond through the appropriate channels." Pavlou announced the case on Twitter, saying he was "seeking damages for breach of contract, negligence, defamation, deceit and conspiracy" and that the case was "not about money".

Expulsion from 2022 Wimbledon men's singles final 

On 10 July 2022, Pavlou was thrown out of the 2022 Wimbledon men's singles final for interrupting the match to shout "where is Peng Shuai" in reference to the Chinese tennis player who disappeared after accusing retired Vice Premier of China Zhang Gaoli of sexual assault. Pavlou claimed that security staff pushed him over a row of seats and down a flight of stairs where he hit his head on a wall while twisting his arms behind his back. Wimbledon officials however denied Pavlou's claims that excessive force had been used against him.

Arrest in London 

On 22 July, Pavlou was arrested by the Metropolitan Police outside the Chinese Embassy in London, while protesting alleged human rights violations perpetrated by the Chinese state, by displaying the flags of Tibet, Taiwan, and Uyghurs. He was allegedly detained for 23 hours in incommunicado without access to lawyers, for an alleged bomb threat; an allegation he denied. Some human rights activists and politicians, also claimed of receiving emails from accounts that were pretending to be Pavlou. Pavlou claimed he was subjected to an "orchestrated campaign".

Although the Metropolitan Police refused to confirm his arrest, the Australian Department of Foreign Affairs and Trade confirmed that they "will raise Mr Pavlou's claim that he was denied consular access before being released with UK authorities." Pavlou says that during his detainment, he had been treated poorly and that the police had told him that he was not allowed to speak to a lawyer during their investigation. Alan Crockford, spokesman for the Metropolitan Police denied allegations of poor treatment during his detainment, and asserted that the department abides to "strict codes of practice under the Police and Criminal Evidence Act" for detainees. British journalist and Liberal Democrat candidate Edward Lucas filed a corruption complaint with Metropolitan Police regarding Pavlou's alleged mistreatment and an investigation is underway.

Political career
In December 2021, Pavlou launched the Drew Pavlou Democratic Alliance federal political party. He announced his intention to run for the Senate in Queensland, alongside five other candidates in New South Wales, South Australia and Queensland. The party's policies include fighting corruption, protecting human rights (with an eye specifically on alleged issues related to the Chinese Communist Party), tackling poverty and homelessness, and building a green economy.

The party contested the 2022 Australian federal election, with Pavlou running for the Australian Senate in his home state of Queensland. Pavlou campaigned against Liberal MP Gladys Liu. Ultimately, the Drew Pavlou Democratic Alliance would fail to win any seats, gathering 0.02% of the vote nationwide.

Brisbane billboard advertising controversy 

On 14 December 2021, Pavlou released a recording of a telephone call between him and a representative of Bishopp Outdoor Advertising, which owns more than 700 billboards across Queensland. Pavlou states that billboard companies are unwilling to run ads in Australia critical of China.

References

1999 births
People from Brisbane
Australian human rights activists
Australian people of Greek Cypriot descent
Living people